Balsas is a town in the south of the El Oro Province in  Ecuador. It is the seat of the Balsas Canton. At the time of census 2001 it had 3,110 inhabitants.

References

External links
 Map of El Oro Province

Populated places in El Oro Province